You Xiaodi and Zhu Lin were the defending champions, but chose not to participate.

Monique Adamczak and Nicole Melichar won the title, defeating Georgia Brescia and Tamara Zidanšek in the final, 6–1, 6–2.

Seeds

Draw

References 
 Draw

Launceston Tennis International - Doubles